Rugby League Hawkes Bay is the local sporting body responsible for the administration of rugby league in the Hawke's Bay region of New Zealand. The RLHB run the local club competition and are responsible for the Hawke's Bay rugby league team. They are part of the New Zealand Rugby League's Mid-Central Zone and their players are eligible for the Central Vipers.

History
Rugby league was first established in the region in 1911 thanks to two former All Golds Jim Gleeson and Edward Tyne. Former All Black David Evans helped persuade three Hawke's Bay clubs; Clive, Ahuriri and Kia Toa, to switch en masse to rugby league and form the basis of the first club competition. Mayor Vigor Brown ensured that rugby league had access to McLean Park. They were admitted to the New Zealand Rugby League that same year.

In 1989, after many years without regular access to local grounds, the Premier and Reserve club finals were both played at McLean Park. 
Among those present were NZRL president George Rainey and chief executive Mike Knowles who with HBRL chairman Kel Lenord met with the Mayor of Napier and other city council personnel that day. It was as a result of the progress rugby league was starting to make again in Hawke's Bay, including access to the park, that the opening game of the 1990 Great Britain tour of New Zealand was played there, against a NZ President's X111.
In the mid-2000s the Hawkes Bay and Gisborne Tairawhiti Rugby League ran a combined club competition called the Eastern Alliance.

Rugby League Hawkes Bay celebrated its centenary in August 2011. Former Kiwi Kevin Tamati is the current chairman.

Club history - Premier Champions
1984: Omahu Huia
1986: Omahu Huia
1987: Omahu Huia
1988: Flaxmere Falcons
1989: Flaxmere Falcons
1991: Flaxmere Falcons
1992: Tamatea
1993: Tamatea
1994: Taradale Eagles
1995: Taradale Eagles
1996: Taradale Eagles
1997: Taradale Eagles
2021: Omahu Huia

Age-grade champions
2008: Tamatea u19's

References

External links
RLHB homepage

Rugby league governing bodies in New Zealand
Rugby league in the Hawke's Bay
1911 establishments in New Zealand